The Bakelberg, at 18 metres above sea level, is the highest point on Fischland. It is in the municipality of Ahrenshoop in the county of Vorpommern-Rügen in the German state of Mecklenburg-Vorpommern.

References 

Hills of Mecklenburg-Western Pomerania
Vorpommern-Rügen